1980 in Korea may refer to:
1980 in North Korea
1980 in South Korea